Air Atlantique was a French passenger and cargo airline, which was founded in 1963. On April 6, 2004, the company was closed due to bankruptcy.

Fleet

Over the years, Air Atlantique operated the following aircraft types:

References

External links

Defunct airlines of France
Airlines established in 1963
Airlines disestablished in 2004